The Panama sand-eel (Bascanichthys panamensis, also known as the Panamic sand-eel in Mexico) is an eel in the family Ophichthidae (worm/snake eels). It was described by Seth Eugene Meek and Samuel Frederick Hildebrand in 1923. It is a marine, tropical eel which is known from the eastern central Atlantic Ocean, including the Gulf of California, Mexico, Costa Rica, Panama, and Nicaragua.

The IUCN redlist currently lists the Panama sand-eel as Least Concern, due to a lack of major threats and observed population decline. It notes, however, that coastal development in its range could prove problematic for the species.

References

Ophichthidae
Fish described in 1923